Piotr Molenda (born 3 March 1962) is a Polish table tennis player. He competed in the men's singles event at the 1988 Summer Olympics.

References

External links
 

1962 births
Living people
Polish male table tennis players
Olympic table tennis players of Poland
Table tennis players at the 1988 Summer Olympics
Sportspeople from Bielsko-Biała